"Après toi" ("After you") was the winning song of the Eurovision Song Contest 1972 performed in French by Greek singer Vicky Leandros, representing . The song was co-written by Leandros' father Leandros Papathanasiou, also known as Leo Leandros, under his pseudonym Mario Panas. This was Vicky Leandros' second entry in the Contest. In 1967 she had finished fourth with "L'amour est bleu" (better known under its English title "Love is Blue") which subsequently went on to become a worldwide hit when covered by French orchestra leader Paul Mauriat.

Description 
"Après toi" is a dramatic ballad, with the singer telling her lover what will happen to her once he has finally left her for someone else; "After you I will be nothing but the shadow of your shadow".

The song was performed seventeenth on the night (following 's Serge & Christine Ghisoland with "À la folie ou pas du tout" and preceding the ' Sandra & Andres with "Als het om de liefde gaat"). By the close of voting, it had received 128 points, placing it first in a field of 18.

Originally, the song was written with German lyrics ("Dann kamst du") and was submitted to the German Eurovision national selection process. When the song did not qualify for that competition, Yves Dessca, who had co-written the lyrics of the  winning song "Un banc, un arbre, une rue", penned French lyrics and the song was chosen internally to represent Luxembourg. Dessca remains the only author/composer ever to score back-to-back Eurovision victories.

Cover versions 
Vicky Leandros also recorded the song in an English language version "Come What May" which was widely released around the world . In South Africa it was a number one hit. In the United Kingdom and Ireland it reached number two in the charts of both countries . Leandros also recorded the song in Italian ("Dopo te"), German ("Dann kamst du"), Spanish ("Y después"), Greek ("Móno esý") and Japanese ("Omoide ni ikiru").

The English version "Come What May" was covered by Filipina singer Pilita Corrales on her 1976 album Live At The Riveira With Pilita Amado Vol. 2.

Charts

References

External links
 Official Eurovision Song Contest site, history by year, 1972.
 Detailed info and lyrics, The Diggiloo Thrush, "Après toi".

Eurovision songs of 1972
French songs
Eurovision songs of Luxembourg
Number-one singles in Switzerland
Eurovision Song Contest winning songs
Philips Records singles
1972 singles
1972 songs
Songs written by Leo Leandros